Rutger is a male given name common in the Netherlands, and a cognate of the first name Roger.

People
Ruotger (died 931), archbishop of Trier
 (c.975–1050), First Duke of Cleves
 (died 1075), Second Duke of Cleves
Rutger von Ascheberg (1621–1693), Swedish cavalry officer and civil servant, one of the principal commanders of Scanian War
Rutger Backe (born 1951), Swedish footballer
Rutger Beke (born 1977), Belgian triathlete
Rutger Bregman (born 1988), Dutch historian
Rutger Castricum (born 1979), Dutch journalist and presenter
 (1682–1753), Swedish military leader
Rutger Gunnarsson (1946–2015), Swedish musician
Rutger Hauer (1944–2019), Dutch actor
Rutger Kopland (1934–2012), Dutch poet and psychiatrist
Rutger Koppelaar (born 1993) Dutch pole vaulter.
Rutger van Langevelt  (1635–1695), Dutch mathematician, painter and architect
Rutger Macklean (1742–1816), Swedish land reformer
Rutger Macklier (1688–1748), Swedish army officer
Rutger McGroarty (born 2004), American ice hockey player
Rutger B. Miller (1805– 1877), member of the United States House of Representatives
Rutger de Regt (born 1979), Dutch designer
Rutger van Schaardenburg (born 1987), Dutch sailor
Rutger Jan Schimmelpenninck (1761–1825), Dutch politician, Grand Pensionary of the Batavian Republic 
Rutger Sernander (1866–1944), Swedish botanist, geologist and archaeologist
Rutger Smith (born 1981), Dutch shot put and discus athlete
Rutger Stuffken (born 1947), Dutch coxswain
Rutger Velpius (c.1540–1614), Flemish printer and bookseller
Rütger Wever (1923–2010), German chronobiologist
Rutger Worm (born 1986), Dutch footballer

Other
5886 Rutger, a Main-belt Asteroid
The Rutger-Steuben Park Historic District in New York, USA

See also
Rogier (disambiguation)
Rüdiger
Rutgers (disambiguation)
Rutgers (surname)
Rutgers University, The State University of New Jersey, USA

Dutch masculine given names
Swedish masculine given names

it:Rutger
nl:Rutger